Latifpur Union is a union of Mirzapur Upazila, Tangail District, Bangladesh. It is situated  5 km northeast of Mirzapur and 33 km southeast of Tangail, The district headquarter.

Demographics
According to Population Census 2011 performed by Bangladesh Bureau of Statistics, The total population of Latifpur union is 16857. There are 3796 households in total.

Education
The literacy rate of Latifpur Union is 55.1% (Male-58.8%, Female-52%).

See also
 Union Councils of Tangail District

References

Populated places in Dhaka Division
Populated places in Tangail District
Unions of Mirzapur Upazila